Avon Park Executive Airport  is a city-owned, public-use airport located two nautical miles (3.7 km) west of the central business district of Avon Park, a city in Highlands County, Florida, United States.

Overview
According to the FAA's National Plan of Integrated Airport Systems for 2009–2013, it is categorized as a general aviation airport.

Facilities and aircraft 
It has two asphalt paved runways: 5/23 is 5,374 by 100 feet (1,638 x 30 m) and 10/28 is 3,844 by 75 feet (1,172 x 23 m).

For the 12-month period ending July 31, 2008, the airport had 32,400 general aviation aircraft operations, an average of 88 per day. At that time there were 48 aircraft based at this airport: 83% single-engine, 13% multi-engine, 2% jet and 2% helicopter.

History
Opened as a civil airport in April 1940 as Avon Park Municipal Airport.  During World War II it was leased by the United States Army Air Forces on 4 October 1941.  During the war, it was assigned to the Army Air Forces Training Command as a contract pilot training airfield, later under Eastern Flying Training Command.  It was designated Avon Park Army Airfield and placed under the jurisdiction of the 61st Army Air Force Fight Training Detachment (Contract Flying).

Operated by the Lodwick Aviation Military Academy, it was used as a primary (level 1) pilot training airfield.  Flying training was performed with Fairchild PT-19s as the primary trainer. Also had several PT-17 Stearmans assigned.  The airfield had three 4'000 hard surfaced for landings and takeoffs. In addition, Avon Park MAP had four auxiliary airfields for emergency and overflow landings: .
 Avon Park Auxiliary Field #1 
 Avon Park Auxiliary Field #2 
 Avon Park Auxiliary Field #3 
 Avon Park Auxiliary Field #4 
All of the Auxiliary airfields were grass all-way runways and not manned.  After the war they were returned to their owners and today are indistinguishable from the surrounding landscape.

Closure
Training Command inactivated the military flying school on 16 October 1944 as part of the drawdown of AAFTC's pilot training program. Declared surplus and turned over to the Army Corps of Engineers on 30 September 1945. Eventually discharged to the War Assets Administration and returned to previous status as a civil airport.

See also

 Florida World War II Army Airfields
 29th Flying Training Wing (World War II)

References

 Manning, Thomas A. (2005), History of Air Education and Training Command, 1942–2002.  Office of History and Research, Headquarters, AETC, Randolph AFB, Texas 
 Shaw, Frederick J. (2004), Locating Air Force Base Sites, History’s Legacy, Air Force History and Museums Program, United States Air Force, Washington DC.

External links

 

Airfields of the United States Army Air Forces in Florida
USAAF Contract Flying School Airfields
1940 establishments in Florida
Airports in Florida
Transportation buildings and structures in Highlands County, Florida
Military airbases established in 1941
Military installations closed in 1945
Airports established in 1940
Avon Park, Florida